Thomas Francis Rosqui (June 12, 1928 – April 12, 1991) was an American character actor known for his versatility at portraying a variety of stage and film roles.

Born in Oakland, California, the son of a Portuguese mother, Sally (née Fernandes), a homemaker, and an Italian father, Thomas A. Rosqui, a traffic manager, Rosqui appeared on Broadway in Sticks and Bones and The Price, among other productions. He also appeared on television, but his most prominent role was as Corleone family bodyguard Rocco Lampone in the first two Godfather movies.

Personal life and death
Rosqui was married to actress Erica Yohn until his death at age 62 in 1991, following a long struggle with cancer. He was survived by a son and two stepchildren.

Filmography

References

External links

1928 births
1991 deaths
American people of Italian descent
American people of Portuguese descent
American male film actors
American male stage actors
American male television actors
20th-century American male actors
20th-century American singers
Deaths from cancer in California